Benjamin Dean Meritt (March 31, 1899 in Durham, North Carolina – July 7, 1989 in Austin, Texas) was a classical scholar, professor and epigraphist of ancient Greece. His father was a professor of Greek and Latin at Trinity College (later Duke University).

Meritt was educated at Hamilton College (B.A. 1920) and Princeton University (M.A. 1923, Ph.D. 1924). He was an assistant director of the American School of Classical Studies at Athens, is notable for his development of the Athenian Tribute Lists and worked extensively on Athenian calendaring.

Meritt taught at a number of universities including University of Vermont, Brown University, University of Michigan, Princeton University and the American School of Classical Studies in Athens. In 1935 he became a member of the faculty at the Institute for Advanced Study, until his retirement.  In 1972, he moved with his wife, Lucy Shoe Meritt, to the University of Texas at Austin as a visiting professor. The following year she became a visiting professor as well.

Selected bibliography
Benjamin Dean Meritt, H. T. Wade-Gery, and Malcolm Francis McGregor. 1939–1953. The Athenian tribute lists. 4 vol. Cambridge, Mass., Harvard University Press.
Benjamin Dean Meritt and John S. Traill. 1974. Inscriptions: the Athenian councillors. Princeton, N.J.: American School of Classical Studies at Athens.

References

External links
 
 In Memoriam: Benjamin Dean Merritt, University of Texas at Austin Faculty Council
 "Dr. Benjamin Merritt, Emeritus Professor, 90." New York Times July 8, 1989

1899 births
1989 deaths
American classical scholars
Classical scholars of the Institute for Advanced Study
Classical scholars of the University of Texas at Austin
Hellenic epigraphers
Hamilton College (New York) alumni
Princeton University alumni
Institute for Advanced Study faculty
Corresponding Fellows of the British Academy